Alvandi may refer to:

Alvandi, East Azerbaijan
Alvandi, Qazvin